Covington Cross is a television series that was broadcast on ABC in the United States from August 25 to October 31, 1992. The series was created by Gil Grant, who was also executive producer. The pilot episode also aired in the United Kingdom, six days after its American broadcast. The series was filmed and produced in the UK, by a British production company, but it was ultimately accountable to an American television network.

Premise
Set in 14th-century England, the series follows the daily intrigues of Sir Thomas Grey, a widower, and his sons and daughter. Covington Cross is the name of Sir Thomas' castle. His children are eldest son, Armus; the serious Richard; free spirited Cedric; and strong-willed daughter, Eleanor. Another son, William, appeared in the pilot episode, but was then directed by the program's writers to fight in the Crusades. Also featuring in Sir Thomas's life is his love interest, Lady Elizabeth.

Characters
 Sir Thomas Grey – Nigel Terry
 Lady Elizabeth – Cherie Lunghi
 William Grey – Ben Porter (pilot episode)
 Armus Grey – Tim Killick
 Richard Grey – Jonathan Firth
 Cedric Grey – Glenn Quinn
 Eleanor Grey – Ione Skye
 Baron John Mullens – James Faulkner
 Friar – Paul Brooke
 Alexandra Mullens (semi-regular) – Laura Howard
 King Edward (semi-regular) – Miles Anderson

Production and broadcast

Thirteen episodes were produced, but only seven aired in the United States after ABC pulled the series from the air in November 1992. The series was an expensive show to produce, thanks to overseas production costs. Most of the cast and crew were British. Once, the show was preempted when its timeslot was bought by businessman Ross Perot for infomercials in an attempt to raise his poll numbers during his independent run for president.

According to a Los Angeles Times article, it was "one of the few American prime-time shows ever to be shot entirely on location in England", with much of the filming was done in and around castles in the English countryside. Allington Castle was used for the exterior scenes, while Penshurst Place in Kent were used for the interior scenes. The village set was filmed at Shepperton Studios, and it was later reused in the sixth season of British television series Red Dwarf as the Gelf village in the episode "Emohawk: Polymorph II".<ref>{{cite book |author1=Chris Howarth |author2=Steve Lyons |year=1997 |title=Red Dwarf: programme guide - Part 4 |page=126}}</ref>

The pilot episode also aired in the United Kingdom, six days after its American broadcast, but the remainder of the series was not shown there, although it was originally intended that the full series would air in Britain in 1993. The program was also broadcast in Ireland in 1994, and in France in 1993 on M6.

Episodes

Reception
The show received mixed critical notice. Howard Rosenberg of Los Angeles Times was muted in his review of the show, describing it as a "pleasing, though occasionally plodding costume drama" that "brings a droll, self-mocking sense of humor to its Middle Ages saga." Todd Everett of Variety praised the show for having "lots of color, production values and a script that doesn't take itself too seriously", further noting that "all tech credits are first rate, with a special nod to costume designer Barbara Lane." However Entertainment Weekly found the show "ludicrous". Tom Shales gave Covington Cross'' a negative review, declaring that "the show plays like a Mel Brooks spoof minus the spoofing". Shales added "Most of the young characters behave like spoiled tots plucked from the '90s and teleported back through the centuries... In other words, the series is historical drama in name only. It's really "Covington Cross, 90210"."

References

External links
 
 

American Broadcasting Company original programming
1992 American television series debuts
1992 American television series endings
Television series by Fremantle (company)
Television shows set in England
Television shows filmed in England
Television series set in the 14th century
Television shows produced by Thames Television
English-language television shows